Antonio Guzmán may refer to:

Antonio Leocadio Guzmán (1801–1884), Venezuelan politician, journalist, and military leader
Antonio Guzmán Blanco (1829–1899), president of Venezuela
Antonio Guzmán Fernández (1911–1982), president of the Dominican Republic
Antonio Guzmán Núñez (born 1953), Spanish footballer
Antonio Jose Guzman (born 1971), Dutch Panamanian artist